Global manga may refer to:
Manfra
Original English-language manga